Russian Air Force Mil Mi-8 helicopter operated by Russian Armed Forces was performing a civilian flight from Tkvarcheli to Gudauta when on December 14, 1992 it was shot down over the village of Lata, in Gulripshi District of Abkhazia, during the War in Abkhazia. All those in the helicopter died: according to various media reports, from 81 to 87 people, many of whom were women evacuated from the besieged city (of which 8 were pregnant) and 35 children. This incident is often called the Lata tragedy. The dead are buried in Gudauta.

Notes

Abkhaz–Georgian conflict
Accidents and incidents involving the Mil Mi-8
1992 in Abkhazia
1992 in Georgia (country)
Aviation accidents and incidents in 1992
Aviation accidents and incidents in Georgia (country)
20th-century aircraft shootdown incidents
1992 disasters in Georgia (country)